The Toronto General Hospital is a major teaching hospital in Downtown Toronto.  Other hospitals in Toronto currently or formerly named "general hospital" include:

 Etobicoke General Hospital
 Michael Garron Hospital, formerly Toronto East General Hospital
 North York General Hospital
 Queensway Health Centre, formerly Queensway General Hospital
 Scarborough General Hospital (Toronto)

See also
 List of hospitals in Toronto